Carl Adam Petri (12 July 1926 in Leipzig – 2 July 2010 in Siegburg) was a German mathematician and computer scientist.

Life and work

Petri created his major scientific contribution, the concept of the Petri net, in 1939 at the age of 13, for the purpose of describing chemical processes. In 1941, his father told him about Konrad Zuse's work on computing machines and Carl Adam started building his own analog computer.

After earning his Abitur at Thomasschule in 1944, he was drafted into the Wehrmacht. He was taken into British captivity until 1949, when he departed England.

Petri started studying mathematics at the Technische Hochschule Hannover (today, the Leibniz University Hannover) in 1950. He documented Petri nets in 1962 as part of his dissertation,  (Communication with automata). From 1959 until 1962 he worked at the University of Bonn and received his PhD degree in 1962 from the Technische Universität Darmstadt. From 1963 to 1968 he established and directed the computing centre of Bonn University. He retired in 1991.

In 1988, Petri became honorary professor of the University of Hamburg. He was a member of the Academia Europaea.

Petri's work significantly advanced the fields of parallel computing and distributed computing, and it helped define the modern studies of complex systems and workflow management systems. His contributions have been in the broader area of network theory, which includes coordination models and theories of interaction, and eventually led to the formal study of software connectors.

Books, papers, and presentations 
 1962
 Kommunikation mit Automaten (Dissertation) by Carl Adam Petri
 1976
 Nicht-sequentielle Prozesse (Work report) by Carl Adam Petri
 Kommunikationsdisziplinen (Internal report) by Carl Adam Petri
 1977
 General net theory (from "Computing System Design: Proceedings of the Joint IBM University of Newcastle upon Tyne Seminar") by Carl Adam Petri
 Communication disciplines (from "Computing System Design: Proceedings of the Joint IBM University of Newcastle upon Tyne Seminar") by Carl Adam Petri
 1979
 Concurrency as a basis of systems thinking (from "Proceedings of the 5th Scandinavian Logic Symposium") by Carl Adam Petri
 Ansätze zur Organisationstheorie rechnergestützter Informationssysteme (Book) by Carl Adam Petri
 1980
 Concurrency (from "Net Theory and Applications, Proceedings of the Advanced Course on General Net Theory of Processes and Systems, Hamburg, October 8–19, 1979") by Carl Adam Petri
 Introduction to General Net Theory (from "Net Theory and Applications, Proc. of the Advanced Course on General Net Theory of Processes and Systems, Hamburg, 1979") by Carl Adam Petri
 1982
 State-Transition Structures in Physics and Computation (article in "International Journal of Theoretical Physics") by Carl Adam Petri
 1987
 Concurrency Theory (from "Petri Nets: Central Models and Their Properties, Advances in Petri Nets 1986, Part I, Proceedings of an Advanced Course, Bad Honnef, September 1986") by Carl Adam Petri
 1996
 Nets, Time and Space (from "Theoretical Computer Science") by Carl Adam Petri
 1997
 Ansprache anläßlich der Verleihung des Werner-von-Siemens-Rings by Carl Adam Petri
 2008
 Petri Nets by Carl Adam Petri and Wolfgang Reisig

Awards
Petri was honored with the following awards:

 1993: Konrad Zuse Medal of the Gesellschaft für Informatik. 
 1997: Werner von Siemens Ring, a prestigious German award in technical sciences.
 1999: Doctorate Honoris Causa from the Universidad de Zaragoza
 2003: honored by Her Majesty the Queen of the Netherlands with the title Commander in the Order of the Netherlands Lion.
 2007: honored for his lifetime achievements by the "Academy of Transdisciplinary Learning and Advanced Studies (ATLAS)" with a "Academy Gold Medal of Honor". 
 2008: Computer Pioneer Award from the IEEE for his inspiration of Petri nets.

See also
 Petri net
 Discrete Event Dynamic Systems (DEDS)

References

External links

 Prof. Dr. Carl Adam Petri

1926 births
2010 deaths
Scientists from Leipzig
Technische Universität Darmstadt alumni
German computer scientists
20th-century German mathematicians
Werner von Siemens Ring laureates
Formal methods people
Academic staff of the University of Bonn
Academic staff of the University of Hamburg
Petri nets
Members of Academia Europaea
Officers Crosses of the Order of Merit of the Federal Republic of Germany
Commanders of the Order of the Netherlands Lion
University of Hanover alumni